John Osborn (born 18 September 1945) is a British sailor, Olympic champion and world champion. He won a gold medal in the Tornado class with Reg White at the 1976 Summer Olympics in Montreal.

He became world champion in the tornado class in 1976, with Reg White.

References

External links

1945 births
Living people
British male sailors (sport)
Sailors at the 1976 Summer Olympics – Tornado
Olympic sailors of Great Britain
Olympic gold medallists for Great Britain
Olympic medalists in sailing
Medalists at the 1976 Summer Olympics
Tornado class world champions
World champions in sailing for Great Britain